The 1968 Hickory 250 was a NASCAR Grand National Series event that was held on April 7, 1968, at Hickory Speedway in Hickory, North Carolina.

Background
Hickory Motor Speedway first opened in 1951 as a  dirt track.  Gwyn Staley won the first race at the speedway and later became the first track champion.  Drivers such as Junior Johnson, Ned Jarrett, and Ralph Earnhardt also became track champions in the 1950s, with Earnhardt  winning five of them.

In 1953, NASCAR's Grand National Series visited the track for the first time.  Tim Flock won the first race at the speedway, which became a regular part of the Grand National schedule.  After winning his track championship in 1952, Junior Johnson became the most successful Grand National driver at Hickory, winning there seven times.

The track has been re-configured three times in its history.  The track became a 0.4-mile (644 meters) dirt track in 1955, which was paved for the first time during the 1967 season.  In 1970, the Hickory track was shortened to a length of 0.363 miles (584 meters).

Race report
The "250" portion of the event's name referred to the number of laps that were scheduled to be performed that day; the race lasted only  overall. It took one hour, fifteen minutes, and thirty-two seconds for the race to reach its conclusion; Richard Petty defeated David Pearson by 0.5 laps in front of ten thousand people; helping Petty to win his third Hickory Cup race in a row. Two cautions were waved for nineteen laps.

Total winnings for the race were $4,940 ($ when adjusted for inflation); with the winner receiving $1,200 ($ when adjusted for inflation). Most of the vehicles that raced in this event had the Ford Motor Company as their manufacturer.

Notable crew chiefs for the race were Harry Hyde, Dale Inman, Frankie Scott, Jake Elder, Tom Vandiver, and Ray Hicks.

Precipitation was relatively absent during the day of the race, although rain and/or melted snow was reported at the nearest airport on that day. For people who were driving to the race track that day, visibility on the road was a vivid .

The transition to purpose-built racecars began in the early 1960s and occurred gradually over that decade.  Changes made to the sport by the late 1960s brought an end to the "strictly stock" vehicles of the 1950s.

Qualifying

Finishing order
Section reference: 

 Richard Petty
 David Pearson†
 Bobby Isaac†
 Friday Hassler†
 James Hylton*
 John Sears†
 Jack Ingram
 Roy Tyner†
 Bill Seifert
 Elmo Langley†
 Clyde Lynn†
 Henley Gray
 G.C. Spencer*†
 Jabe Thomas†
 Neil Castles*
 Buck Baker*†
 Wayne Smith*
 Bob Cooper*
 Wendell Scott*†
 Paul Dean Holt*
 Bill Vanderhoff*
 Jim Vandiver*†

* Driver failed to finish race 
† signifies that the driver is known to be deceased

Timeline
Section reference: 
 Start of race: David Pearson takes over the lead from Richard Petty.
 Lap 5: Jim Vandiver developed terminal problems with his driveshaft, forcing him off the track.
 Lap 9: Bobby Isaac takes over the lead from David Pearson.
 Lap 31: The coils on Bill Vanderhoff's vehicle became problematic, ending his weekend on the track.
 Lap 99: Bob Cooper's vehicle overheated; ending his day on the track.
 Lap 115: Buck Baker's engine developed problems, causing him to withdraw from the event.
 Lap 122: Neil Castles' engine became problematic, forcing him to exit the race.
 Lap 125: Richard Petty takes over the lead from Bobby Isaac.
 Lap 136: David Pearson takes over the lead from Richard Petty.
 Lap 187: Richard Petty takes over the lead from David Pearson.
 Lap 222: The differential on G.C. Spencer's vehicle stopped working properly, forcing him to leave the race.
 Lap 244: James Hylton's engine became problematic; forcing him to exit the race.
 Finish: Richard Petty was officially declared the winner of the event.

References

Hickory 250
Hickory 250
Hickory 250
NASCAR races at Hickory Motor Speedway